Open MPI is a Message Passing Interface (MPI) library project combining technologies and resources from several other projects (FT-MPI, LA-MPI, LAM/MPI, and PACX-MPI). It is used by many TOP500 supercomputers including Roadrunner, which was the world's fastest supercomputer from June 2008 to November 2009, and K computer, the fastest supercomputer from June 2011 to June 2012.

Overview

Open MPI represents the merger between three well-known MPI implementations:

 FT-MPI from the University of Tennessee
 LA-MPI from Los Alamos National Laboratory
 LAM/MPI from Indiana University

with contributions from the PACX-MPI team at the University of Stuttgart. These four institutions comprise the founding members of the Open MPI development team.

The Open MPI developers selected these MPI implementations as excelling in one or more areas. Open MPI aims to use the best ideas and technologies from the individual projects and create one world-class open-source MPI implementation that excels in all areas. The Open MPI project specifies several top-level goals:

 to create a free, open source software, peer-reviewed, production-quality complete MPI-3.0 implementation
 to provide extremely high, competitive performance (low latency or high bandwidth)
 to involve the high-performance computing community directly with external development and feedback (vendors, 3rd party researchers, users, etc.)
 to provide a stable platform for 3rd-party research and commercial development
 to help prevent the "forking problem" common to other MPI projects
 to support a wide variety of high-performance computing platforms and environments

Code modules
The Open MPI code has 3 major code modules:
 OMPI - MPI code
 ORTE - the Open Run-Time Environment
 OPAL - the Open Portable Access Layer

Commercial implementations
 Sun HPC Cluster Tools - beginning with version 7, Sun switched to Open MPI
 Bullx MPI—In 2010 Bull announced the release of bullx MPI, based on Open MPI

Consortium
Open MPI development is performed within a consortium of many industrial and academic partners. The consortium also covers several other software projects such as the hwloc (Hardware Locality) library which takes care of discovering and modeling the topology of parallel platforms.

See also
 Message Passing Interface
 MPICH
 Simple Linux Utility for Resource Management (SLURM)

References

External links
 Open MPI Project Homepage
 RCE01: Open MPI - RCE Podcast interview

Concurrent programming libraries
Free software